William Leonard Christian (born September 30, 1955) is an American stage and television actor. He is recognized for playing the role of Police Chief Derek Frye on the soap opera  All My Children from 1990 to 2007, and currently portrays the role of TR Coates on Days of Our Lives.

Early life and education
Born in Washington, D.C., Christian attended elementary school at St. Francis De Sales where he was first exposed to acting. He then attended Archbishop Carroll High School where he participated in the theater program. Christian attended at the Catholic University of America, where he learned about theatre and earned his bachelor's degree. He then attended at the American University, where earned his master's degree based on drama.

Career
Christian moved to New York in the early 1980s, for which he was a member of the Actors Information Project, where he performed in stage productions. He appeared in commercials such as American Express and Burger King, among others. Christian performed in the 1989 Off-Broadway revival of the play The Member of the Wedding, appearing with actress Esther Rolle. Christian guest-starred in television programs including The Cosby Show, ER, Malcolm in the Middle, Spin City, Hand of God (four episodes), Matlock, Desperate Housewives and Monk. In 1990, he was cast in the recurring role of Dr. Marshall Redd on Another World. He then went on to portray the role of Derek Frye on All My Children from 1990 to 2007. For this, he was nominated for a Daytime Emmy Award in the category Outstanding Supporting Actor in a Drama Series in 1991. In 1995, Christian had spoke out at the Youth Forum Against Violence at the Network Club, making a speech to young people in Springfield, Massachusetts. In 1996, he appeared in the Off-Broadway revival of the play The Boys in the Band.

Christian first appeared on Days of Our Lives in 2018, where he portrayed an uncredited role known as "minion". In 2022, he was cast as TR Coates on Days of Our Lives, first appearing in the January 26, 2022, episode. Christian was cast following discussions with co-executive producer Albert Alarr. He presently resides in Boston, Massachusetts with his family, and attributes them for encouraging him to take on the role.

Personal life
In 2002, Christian married Gail Samuel. In 2021, Samuel would become the first female president and CEO of Boston Symphony Orchestra. The couple welcomed their first child in the summer of 2005. The have two sons, Samuel and Orlando. Christian currently lives in Boston with his wife and sons.

Filmography

Film

Television

References

External links 

Rotten Tomatoes profile

1955 births
Living people
Actors from Washington, D.C.
American male stage actors
American male television actors
American male soap opera actors
20th-century American male actors
21st-century American male actors
20th-century African-American people
21st-century African-American people
Catholic University of America alumni
American University alumni